Abrash (also known as Abrashk (Persian: ابرشک), Āvāreshk, and Qal‘eh Amrish) is a village in Piveh Zhan Rural District, Ahmadabad District, Mashhad County, Razavi Khorasan Province, Iran. At the 2006 census, its population was 499, in 139 families.

See also 

 List of cities, towns and villages in Razavi Khorasan Province

References 

Populated places in Mashhad County